The thicklip grey mullet, Chelon labrosus, is a coastal fish of the family Mugilidae. It is named after its thick upper lip and silvery-grey appearance.

It is a common fish of shallow, sheltered coasts, estuaries, and around power station and sewer outfalls; it can also enter fresh water areas.

It lives in the northeastern Atlantic Ocean from Iceland to Senegal and Cape Verde, including the Mediterranean Sea and the southwestern Black Sea. This species is partially migratory, heading northwards in summer.

It feeds mainly on benthic diatoms, epiphytic algae, small invertebrates and detritus.

The thicklip grey mullet lays its eggs in winter. Both eggs and fry are pelagic.

Human interaction
The thicklip grey mullet is valued both as a food fish and as a tenacious game fish.

References

thicklip grey mullet
Fish of Europe
Fish of the Mediterranean Sea
Marine fauna of North Africa
Taxa named by Antoine Risso
thicklip grey mullet